RenaissanceRe Holdings Ltd  is an American provider of reinsurance, insurance and other related business services. The company operates in reinsurance, insurance and ventures.

Reinsurance includes Renaissance Reinsurance Ltd., DaVinci Reinsurance Ltd., Top Layer Reinsurance Ltd., RenaissanceRe Europe AG, RenaissanceRe Syndicate 1458, and RenaissanceRe Specialty U.S. Ltd.

The insurance segment includes RenaissanceRe Syndicate 1458.

Ventures include RenaissanceRe Ventures Ltd. and Renaissance Underwriting Managers, Ltd. In 2013, the company's annual revenue was 405,209,000 dollars.

References

External links 
 

Financial services companies established in 1993
Companies listed on the New York Stock Exchange
Insurance companies of Bermuda
Holding companies of Bermuda